Harf may refer to:

 Al harf, Yemen
 HArF, the first known compound of the chemical element argon
 Marie Harf (1981-), Deputy Spokesperson for the US State Department
 Stella Harf (1890-1979), German actress